Velizar Emilov Popov (born 7 February 1976) is a Bulgarian professional former player and current UEFA PRO Head Coach /  football manager, who is known for an aggressive attacking high intensity football style which brings in results and development to his players and teams. Currently he is the Head Coach / Manager of V.League 1 club Thanh Hóa.

During his career as a player, he has played for Lokomotiv Plovdiv, Hebar Pazardzhik and Spartak Plovdiv. Popov is the only Bulgarian manager to have managed abroad 10 different teams in eight different countries including two national teams and one of the best ambassadors of the Bulgarian coaching guild abroad, especially in Asia. He is the first Bulgarian manager who won historic treble with a 100% winning record in 2013 abroad and the Group Stage in AFC Cup. Popov is also the first Bulgarian manager who has ever worked in the Moldovan Premier League in 2011, Thailand Premier League in 2014, in the Malaysian Super League in 2016, and Vietnam V.League 1 in 2023. In 2019, Popov became the first Bulgarian manager to win the Group Stage and a medal from the Southeast Asian Games as well. Popov is a coach with over two decades of experience across the world with extensive stints in Europe, Asia and the Middle East, gained experience with more than 200 official games as a head coach in domestic leagues and international competitions in Bulgaria, Denmark, Moldova, Thailand, Malaysia, Vietnam and Oman. As manager of the Maldives senior and Olympic national teams, he participated in international competitions such as World Cup Qualifiers, AFC Cup, AFF Championship and Southeast Asian Games.

Coaching career

Cherno More 
Popov had been appointed on 16 September 2009 as the manager of Cherno More Varna to replace Nikola Spasov after two years of working as his assistant. He made his debut as a football manager in the Bulgarian A PFG on 20 September 2009 in a match against Minyor Pernik. The youngest manager in the Bulgarian League led Cherno More in 36 appearances for the A PFG and three matches of the Bulgarian Cup. Velizar remains in history as the coach who reached the most expressive win of Cherno More against the leader in Bulgarian Championship Levski Sofia. In December 2009 the sailors defeated the blue team with 4-1 in the Bulgarian Cup. In June 2010 Velizar Popov attracted in PFC Cherno more one of Brazilian superstar Mário Jardel, who was the most famous name ever having played in the Bulgarian league.

In October 2010, Popov left Bulgarian PFC Cherno More and moved to Danish Team Liberika Horsens, with which he won promotion in 2011. For the Season 2011-2012 Popov led Moldovan FC Costuleni which play in the Premier League Moldova.

New Radiant 

In January 2013, Popov headed the Maldivian champion New Radiant and won the Maldivian championship with a 100% winning record, the best score ever. He also won the Maldives FA Cup and the Supercup Milo Charity Shields, making the treble. This was the third time New Radiant won the league while the very first time a club has confirmed the league title with one round yet to play and with a 100% winning record. New Radiant broke the maximum league points record of 53 points set by VB Sports in 2010 by taking the Blues league points to 57, becoming the first team in history to finish off the league with a 100 percent record. New Radiant won all 19 matches they played, scoring an outstanding 73 goals and conceding only 5 goals.

In the Asian AFC Cup Popov got to impressive results for the first time in the history of Maldivian football. The team scored the biggest win ever in the AFC Cup 7–0 against Indonesian team Persib. New Radiant finished on the top of the group stage with the best attacking record of 20 goals in 6 games and second best defensive record of the tournament receiving 4 goals in 6 games. The club won the group with 15 points from 6 games —the best score ever in Maldivian football history— and qualified for the quarterfinals for the second time in the history of Maldives football winning Selangor from Malaysia by 2-0 after extra time. Popov won 2013 Maldives Haveeru Awards - Best Coach of the year award  after guiding the blues to Charity Shield, Dhivehi League and FA Cup success with a 100% winning record leading the team to AFC Cup Quarter finals and also The Special Excellence Award of New Radiant SC for the historical season winning all domestic titles with 100% record.

Sur Sport Club 

On 7 October, just two days after winning the FA Cup for historic treble with New Radiant, Popov left the Maldives champion to take on former champion of Oman, Sur Sports Club signing a one-year contract until the end of the 2013/2014 season. Popov debut in one of the most attractive derby matches in Omani League defeating local rivals Al-Oruba 3-0. Just for 3 months Popov managed to climb Sur Club from 10 to 3 position in the standings and registering the best attack in the league. As a consequence, for the first time in the history of the club five players from Sur Club are already part of the Olympic national team of Oman.

Suphanburi F.C. 

For the 2014 season, Popov was appointed as the new manager of Suphanburi F.C. of the Thai Premier League. Popov led the team to the 6th position from 20 teams in the final league table and led Suphanburi to their first FA Cup semi final appearance in club history.

Maldives national football team 

In January 2015, Popov was unveiled as the new manager of Maldives national team, in a ceremony held before the kick off of POMIS Cup Final, returning to the country where he led New Radiant to an unprecedented domestic treble in 2013. Maziya coach Ismail Mahfooz and former national team captain Assad Abdul Ghanee are the assistant coaches and Aslam Abdul Raheem is the goal keeper trainer.

Popov is a popular figure among Maldivian football players and supporters. Popov embarks on his first foray into national team coaching. Popov was very close to making one of the biggest surprises ever in the Asian football in the world cup qualifiers against Qatar. The favourite Qatar needed 9 minutes of added time to beat the Maldives in a World Cup qualifier with the lone goal coming in the ninth minute of added time, even though there was only supposed to be eight minutes of added time. In the Indian Ocean Islands Games Maldives with Popov won their first match ever in this competition after 3 participations so far beating the old rival Seychelles 2-1. On 12 August 2015, Popov resigned as the Maldives national football team coach. National team captain Ali Ashfaq ‘Dhagandey’ and keeper Imran Mohamed had criticized FAM following Popov's decision to resign.

Kelantan FA

On 12 May 2016 the Malaysian giant Kelantan FA hired Popov to handle the Super League side until the end of the 2016 season, following K.Devan’s resignation after an unsatisfactory performance of the team under his guidance. Popov was tasked with ensuring Kelantan finish in the top four of the Super League. Devan left after making his intention to step aside known to Annuar following a 4-3 defeat to Pahang on April 20 but waited until Wednesday to make his decision public. Following a search for a successor, Tan Sri Annuar Musa  made contact with Popov on Monday, with the Bulgarian arriving the following day to hold talks. Kelantan were in sixth place in the Super League standings with 12 points, six points adrift of third-placed Selangor.

Popov, is not an unknown figure among Malaysian football players and supporters, after eliminated the giant Selangor on 2013 AFC Cup 1/8 finals with New Radiant, in 2014 also was close to sign with Perak FA, but in the last moment had signed with Thai Premier League club Suphanburi FC.
He made his debut as Kelantan Head Coach against Selangor away on May 18 in Shah Alam stadium with impressive performance played more than 70 min with 10 players after the red card of Wan Zack in the massive derby draw 0-0. Popov reached the most expressive and biggest win ever in the history of the club in away official match for Kelantan on July 15 against Terengganu 6:1 in Kuala Terengganu in the East Coast derby. Kelantan under Popov's guidance became the first team to qualify for this year's Malaysia Cup quarter-finals after three wins and one draw in their first four group stage matches.

On 27 September 2016 Kelantan FA (KAFA) chairman Tan Sri Annuar Musa announced that KAFA have been satisfied with Popov so far, and have seen it fit to allow him to pick his own side proposed him the extension of the contract for the following 2017 season. “KAFA are satisfied with the commitment shown by Popov and would like him to pick his own ‘dream team’, to ensure 2017 is a successful year for Kelantan,” explained the chairman. The former Maldives National Team head coach joined Kelantan in May on what was described by Annuar as a ‘flexi-contract’ following the resignation of former head coach K. Devan. Apart from the extension, Popov will also be given full rein with the appointment of team staff and players both local and foreign in 2017, Annuar announced.

On 23 October 2016, Kelantan FA chairman Annuar Musa has announced that the club have accepted Popov's reject to extend his contract for the new 2017 season, and Kelantan have no choice but to let Popov leave, one day after he guided the side to a fourth-place finish in the 2016 Super league. Writing on his Facebook page, Annuar explained that Kelantan had offered Popov a substantial salary raise, but he cited personal and family reasons for his departure.

"The reason given (by Popov) was personal and concerning his family. For your information, KAFA (Kelantan FA) have offered him a one-year contract with a 60% salary increment, given KAFA's current financial limitations," explained the chairman.
However Annuar commended Popov's contribution and willingness to serve the side, despite knowing the challenges that he would be facing.
"KAFA and I want to thank Popov's exemplary service. He came on the basis of a long-standing friendship, accepting a salary that was not any higher than what was received by his predecessor, a local coach (K. Devan).
"I fully understand the challenges he has been facing at Kelantan, and wish him success. He is a model professional, but maybe it is not our time yet to secure his service," conceded the chairman.
Annuar ended his post by adding that no replacement coach has been identified to take over from Popov.
The conclusion of the league action on Saturday sees Popov's Kelantan finishing in fourth. Under him, Kelantan won eight, drawn six and lost five matches in all competitions.
An initial discussion between Annuar and Popov on the team's plans for 2017 around a month earlier had seemed positive, with the former announcing that the latter will continue coaching Kelantan for another year, but as it can be seen, the deal has apparently fallen through.

Sisaket FC

Popov returned to the Thai Premier League as manager of Sisaket FC, after last coaching in the country in 2014 with Suphanburi FC. The Dangerous Koupreys are based in the Sisaket province of Thailand, and finished 13th in the league last season. In 2015 they came the closest to winning a major title, finishing runners up in the Thai League Cup. Popov was tasked with ensuring Sisaket FC finish out of the last 3 teams in the bottom of the table-the current position of the team at the moment after 6 matches with only 3 points after one win and five defeats. Popov last coached in Thailand in 2014, with Suphanburi FC before leaving to take up the Maldives national team head coach post in 2015. Popov then joined Kelantan midway through the 2016 Malaysia Super League season, overturning the Red Warriors' poor performance and guiding them to a fourth-place finish in the league, and the quarter-final stage of the 2016 Malaysia Cup. However he left the Kota Bharu-based side at the end of the season, after the club could not meet his requirements for a contract extension.
Despite the short time and the difficult schedule, Popov's Sisaket FC managed to win 15 points by the end of the first half of the season in the Thai Premier league T1 and after the fundamental wins against the direct rivals Sukhothai and Thai Honda managed to climb the team over the area of the relegation zone by equalizing points but with advantage in the direct duels with Sukhothai and Thai Honda. The crucial away win against Thai Honda was the first away win for Sisaket FC after more than one year in all domestic competitions.Velizar Popov has officially parted ways with Sisaket FC on good terms after mutual agreement with the management of the club stepped down from the team on August 1, according to the announcement from the Thai Premier League 1 side. His decision was announced on Tuesday,August 1, after the 41-year-old officially had a meeting with the club president and managers and handed in the resignation to withdraw from the coaching responsibility.
Popov returns to the Thai League 1 as Sisaket FC head coach in March 2017, after last coaching in the country in 2014 with Suphanburi FC. After that, he left the country to take up the Maldives national team head coach post in 2015.
He then joined Malaysia Super League side Kelantan in 2016, and successfully guided them to a fourth-place finish in the league, even took the Red Warriors to the quarter-final stage of the 2016 Malaysia Cup.

Sur Sport Club 

In 2018 Popov was appointed as a new head coach of Sur Sport Club at Oman, who had just returned to the Oman Professional Premier League after 2 years in the second tier of the Oman League. Popov is a popular figure among Oman football players and the fans supported his return after already had spells with Sur SC during the season 2013-2014 when made his debut in one of the most attractive derby matches in the Oman League, defeated the local rivals Al Oruba with 3-0. He managed to lead Sur SC climb from the 10th to 3rd position in the standings and registered the best attack in the league. As a consequence, for the first time in the history of the club five players from Sur SC became already part of the Olympic national team of Oman and already two players are part of the senior national team. “Delighted to return in Oman and after being approached to come back again as a head coach at Sur SC after a few years away it was an easy decision to make, so I'm very excited about! Looking forward to the new coming campaign with renewed enthusiasm and energy to working with the team and believe we can really push on this season in Oman Professional Premier League.''-explained Popov to the local Oman sport media.

Myanmar National Football Olympic Team U-23 

In January 2019 Popov was appointed as a new head coach of Myanmar National Football Olympic Team U-23 for this year's 2019 AFC Olympic Qualifiers, AFF Championship in Cambodia and SEA Games in Philippines. His appointment was announced by the Myanmar Football Federation (MFF) on Wednesday.

Myanmar are widely regarded as an emerging force in Southeast Asia but have seen their progress stagnate recently, highlighted by their group-stage exit at the last year's AFF Cup following a semi-final appearance in 2016.
The Under-23s also finished runners-up at the 2015 SEA Games, which was followed by a fourth-place finish two years later – when the tournament was converted to an Under-22 competition.
There is no shortage of outstanding talent for Popov to work with, although inconsistency and indiscipline are often recognised as two factors preventing Myanmar from reaching the level of regional powerhouses Thailand and Vietnam.
But, with six players from the AFF Cup 2018 squad eligible for this year's SEA Games – Phone Thit Sar Min, Sann Sat Naing, Soe Moe Kyaw, Ye Yint Aung, Htet Phyo Wai and Lwin Moe Aung – Popov will definitely have some youngsters with valuable experience to build his side around, along with fellow bright prospects Myat Kaung Khant and Hein Phyo Win. In the AFC Qualifiers Myanmar under Popov reached the most expressive and biggest win ever in the history of the U-23 National Team against Timor Leste 7-0. In the biggest South East Asian tournament Velizar Popov’s Myanmar have entered the semifinals of men’s football in SEA Games 2019 after impressive group stage campaign winning against the host Philippines 2-1, Timor Leste 3-1, Cambodia 2-1 and drawing with Malaysia 1-1,Myanmar made it 10 points from four group fixtures to enter the knockouts, they have left Cambodia, Philippines and Malaysia, all on four points with one matchday left, to fight it out for the one remaining last four slot available for Group A. Myanmar have claimed the men’s football bronze medal at SEA Games 2019 after beat Cambodia 5-4 on penalties following a 2-2 draw at the Rizal Memorial Stadium in the match for the 3rd place.  
In December 2020, the technical committee of the Myanmar Football Federation, after a thorough analysis of the team's performance in the last two years, decided to propose a new contract to Popov.
The MFF Secretary General U Ko Ko Thein said that the agreement of his contract extension was reached till the end of 2021 SEA Games.
“We are very pleased with the work of Mr Velizar Popov with the team so far and we reached an agreement last week to renew his contract. He agreed to extend the contract with the U23 Myanmar until the end of the 2021 SEA Games in Viet Nam. We are also planning to sign a contract with Mr Popov soon, ” U Ko Ko Thein said. Popov confirmed the proposal of Myanmar Football Federation (MFF) to extend his contract for another year until the end of 2021.
“Delighted to have been offered and can confirm that I agreed to accept the proposal of the Myanmar Football Federation (MFF) to extend my contract for another year until the end of 2021”, said Popov.
“We have already improved many things in technical, tactical, physical, and mental aspects during 2019, both collectively as a team and individually as the development of each player; in 2020 the pandemic has made it difficult and we couldn’t progress the way we wanted, but we’re excited about the future in 2021 and where we want to reach next year is a faraway, distant place right now, so we’ll keep trying and moving forward in order to improve more and to achieve something bigger.
Thanks to the Myanmar Football Federation (MFF) and Myanmar National League (MNL) Clubs, we will restart our preparation for all important tournaments in 2021 as SEA Games, AFC Qualifiers, and AFF Championship with Pre-Season Camp on January 10 until March 14”, the head coach added. 

Remarkably, in the men’s football competition of the 2019 SEA Games in the Philippines, Velizar Popov assisted team Myanmar winning the bronze medal.

Managerial statistics

Honours

 2021 Runner-up AFC U-23 Asian Cup Qualification
 2019 Southeast Asian Games bronze medal
 2019 Runner-up AFC U-23 Championship qualification
 2013 Dhivehi Premier League Winner
 2013 FA Cup Winner
 2013 Charity Shield Super Cup Winner
 2013 Maldives Haveeru Awards - Best Coach of The Year
 2013 The Special Excellence Award of New Radiant SC for the historical season winning all domestic titles with 100% record
 2011 FC Liberika -Horsens, Denmark- Promotion Winner
 2008 Bulgarian Cup Runner-up 
 2006 The Best Youth Coach-BFU Varna
 2005 The Best Youth Coach-BFU Varna

Record-Breaking Achievements
 2019 with Myanmar National Olympic Team U’23 - the biggest ever win in official match / Myanmar-Timor Leste 7:0 in AFC ASEAN Cup Qualifiers
 2016 with TRW Kelantan - the biggest win ever in the history of the club in away official match for against their biggest rival Terengganu 6:1 in Kuala Terengganu in the East Coast derby for the Malaysian Super League
 2015 with Maldives National Team - in the Indian Ocean Islands Games the first and only ever win in this competition after 3 participations so far beating the old rival Seychelles 2:1
 2014 with Suphanburi FC - the first and only semi final in Thai FA Cup ever in the history of the club
 2013 with New Radiant SC - becoming the first team ever in the Maldivian football history to finish off the whole season with a 100 percent record winning all 4 domestic trophies / Dhivehi Premier League Champions , FA Cup Winner, Charity Shield Super Cup Winner, President Cup Winner 
 2013 with New Radiant SC - first time AFC Cup Group stage Winner with the best attacking record and qualified for the AFC Cup quarterfinals
 2013 with New Radiant SC - the biggest win ever for any Maldivian club in international competition in AFC Cup 7:0 against FC Persib in Indonesia 
 2013 with New Radiant SC - the biggest win ever in local domestic competition 10:1 against VB Sports in the Dhivehi Premier League
 2009 with PFC Cherno More - the biggest win ever against their biggest domestic rival FC Levski Sofia 4:1 in Bulgarian Cup

References

External links
 Official website

1976 births
Living people
Bulgarian footballers
Bulgarian football managers
PFC Lokomotiv Plovdiv players
FC Hebar Pazardzhik players
FC Spartak Plovdiv players
PFC Cherno More Varna managers
Kelantan FA managers
Association football defenders
Association football midfielders
Bulgarian expatriate football managers